StarWind Software, Inc. is a privately held Beverly, Massachusetts-based computer software and hardware appliance company specializing in storage virtualization and software-defined storage.

History 

StarWind Software began in 2008 as a spin-off from Rocket Division Software, Ltd. (founded in 2003), with a round A of investment from venture capital firm ABRT. It started providing early adopters with initially free software defined storage offerings in 2009, including its V2V (virtual-to-virtual) image converter and iSCSI SAN software. 

In 2013, hard drive manufacturer Western Digital began integrating StarWind's iSCSI engine with some of the company's Network Attached Storage (NAS) appliances. 

In mid-April 2014, StarWind Software closed a round B of investment from Almaz Capital and AVentures Capital.

In August 2015, StarWind announced a combined software-hardware product called HyperConverged Appliance.

In April 2016, StarWind was selected by research firm Gartner as one of its 2016 "Cool Vendors for Compute Platforms". 

In February 2020, StarWind's Hyperconverged Infrastructure (HCI) software StarWind VSAN set performance benchmarks for off the shelf commodity hardware. In December, StarWind was named to Gartner's Magic Quadrant for HCI software.

In March 2022, the Wall Street Journal reported how the 2022 Russian invasion of Ukraine was affecting technology firms with a significant presence in Ukraine, including StarWind. Once the invasion was imminent, the company helped its employees move out of the country, including relocating 60 of the 180 workers from its Kyiv, Ukraine office to Wroclaw, Poland. The company also reportedly doubled the salaries of employees who enlisted in the Ukrainian army.

Products
StarWind develops standards-based storage virtualization and management software that will run on any x86 platform. Its software defined storage software supports building iSCSI, iSER, NVM Express over Fabrics (NVMe-oF), and NFSv3/v4 and SMB3 NAS using commodity hardware. 

Its products include:

StarWind HyperConverged Appliance - the company's HyperConverged Appliance bundles StarWind's VSAN software with third party server and storage hardware, along with storage management software and hypervisors such as from VMware or Hyper-V.
Virtual SAN (VSAN) software - HCI software which allows customers to set up and operate a storage area network supporting clustering and multi-host access on any standard 64-bit or 32-bit Windows server.  The software acts as the storage back end for virtualized servers such as VMware vSphere server and Microsoft Hyper-V, and also supports standard server applications requiring network storage, such as Microsoft Exchange or SQL Server. Open source NVMe SPDK for Windows Server is used to support the NVMe-oF uplink protocol, together with iSCSI and iSER.
 Free NAS & SAN - software for converting commodity servers into iSCSI and NFS/SMB3 targets. 
V2V Converter - a free converter allowing back and forth conversion of virtual storage files between VMware's open format Virtual Machine Disk (VMDK) and Virtual Hard Disk (VHD), the format for Microsoft's hypervisor (virtual machine system), Hyper-V.
P2V Migrator - a free tool for converting physical servers to various virtual machine formats.
StarWind VTL - a virtual tape library that can be used to replace tape drives with less expensive Serial ATA (SATA) drives, and offloading storage to public cloud, for long term storage. 
StarWind iSCSI Accelerator – a driver that improves CPU utilization with multi-core CPUs, when used with Microsoft iSCSCI Initiator.
StarWind NVMe-oF Initiator – Windows software used to initiate the NVM Express open logical-device specification. It maps the NVMe driver over an RDMA or TCP network to make remote NVMe drives appear to be attached to a physical server.

Operations
StarWind is headquartered in Beverly, Massachusetts.

References

External links 

Software companies based in Massachusetts
Software companies established in 2008
American companies established in 2008
2008 establishments in the United States
2008 establishments in Massachusetts
Companies based in Essex County, Massachusetts
Beverly, Massachusetts
Privately held companies based in Massachusetts
Software companies of the United States